The Alcohol (Minimum Pricing) (Scotland) Act 2012 is an Act of the Scottish Parliament, which introduces a statutory minimum price for alcohol, initially 50p per unit, as an element in the programme to counter alcohol problems.

The Act was passed with the support of the Scottish National Party, the Conservatives, the Liberal Democrats and the Greens. The opposition, Scottish Labour, refused to support the legislation because the Act failed to claw back an estimated £125m windfall profit from alcohol retailers. The Labour MSP Malcolm Chisholm, the former Minister for Health and Community Care, disobeyed his party's whip and supported the government.

Legal challenge
A legal challenge to the minimum pricing legislation failed at the Court of Session. The Scotch Whisky Association, the Confédération Européenne des Producteurs de Spiritueux and the Comité Européen des Entreprises Vins appealed the judgement.  The act was delayed, with a legal challenge by the Scotch Whisky Association being referred to the Court of Justice of the European Union by the Court of Session.

The decision of the court, delivered in December 2015, was that such legislation would only be lawful if alternative policies such as higher taxes would not be effective in protecting public health.  Scottish judges would be required to consider evidence on this point.

On 15 November 2017, the Supreme Court of the United Kingdom unanimously rejected the Scotch Whisky Association's case, ending the legal battle, arguing that minimum pricing was a "proportionate means of achieving a legitimate aim".

The act came into effect on 1 May 2018.

Effects
Research by Newcastle University published in May 2021 found that alcohol sales dropped by 7.7% in Scotland following the introduction of a minimum price, when compared to north-east England.

A study published in 2021 found reductions in overall purchases of alcohol, largely restricted to households that bought the most alcohol, which continued into 2020.

Similar legislation was implemented in Wales in March 2020 with the Public Health (Minimum Price for Alcohol) (Wales) Act 2018.

See also
Long-term effects of alcohol consumption

References

External links

Minimum Pricing at the Scottish Government website

Acts of the Scottish Parliament 2012
Retailing in Scotland
Scots law
Alcohol in Scotland
Alcohol abuse in the United Kingdom
Health law in Scotland
Alcohol law in the United Kingdom
Price controls
Regulation in the United Kingdom